David Beckham Soccer is a football video game for PlayStation, PlayStation 2 and Xbox, Game Boy Advance and Game Boy Color. All formats were developed and published by Rage Software, apart from the Game Boy versions which were developed by Majesco Entertainment And Yoyo Entertainment.

Reception

The game received mixed reviews. IGN gave the Game Boy Advance version of the game a negative review, rating it 2.2 out of 10. IGN criticized the gameplay stating "The Artificial intelligence (AI) provides no challenge, the controls provide no depth, and the gameplay provides no fun" and the sound by saying it was "eerily silent".

The game would go on to be Rage Software's most successful boxed release in the UK.

References

External links
David Beckham Soccer at GameSpot

Association football video games
2001 video games
Game Boy Advance games
Game Boy Color games
PlayStation (console) games
PlayStation 2 games
Xbox games
Video games scored by Jake Kaufman
Video games developed in the United Kingdom
Rage Games games
Video games based on real people
Cultural depictions of David Beckham
Majesco Entertainment games
Multiplayer and single-player video games